Radio Star may refer to:

 Radio star, in astronomy
 Radio Star (film), a 2006 South Korean film
 Radio Star (TV series), a 2007 South Korean TV series